Ptilodontoidea is a group of extinct mammals from the Northern Hemisphere.  
They were generally small, somewhat rodent-like creatures of the extinct order Multituberculata.

Some of these genera boast a great many species, though remains are generally sparse.  
Ptilodus is among the best known, and there's a tendency to depict it as an analog of a squirrel.

Upper Cretaceous remains are known from North America and Europe. Later representatives (Paleocene - Eocene) hail from North America, Europe and Asia. These were some of the last multituberculates, and they are within the suborder Cimolodonta.

The superfamily is further divided into the following families:
Neoplagiaulacidae - 10 genera; 
Ptilodontidae - 4 genera;
Cimolodontidae - possibly 3 genera.

The affinities of Neoliotomus are less clear, though it seems to fit somewhere within the superfamily.

References 
 Kielan-Jaworowska Z & Hurum JH (2001), "Phylogeny and Systematics of multituberculate mammals." Paleontology 44, p. 389-429.
 Much of this information has been derived from  MESOZOIC MAMMALS; Ptilodontoidea, an Internet directory.

 
Cretaceous mammals
Paleocene mammals
Eocene mammals
Eocene extinctions